Neuermark-Lübars is a village and a former municipality in the district of Stendal, in Saxony-Anhalt, Germany. Since 1 January 2010, it is part of the municipality Klietz.

References

Former municipalities in Saxony-Anhalt
Stendal (district)